The 2013–14 season is French football club SC Bastia's 108th professional season, their 48th consecutive season in French top-flight, and their 31st consecutive season in Ligue 1. Bastia is president by Pierre-Marie Geronimi, managed by Frédéric Hantz, and captained by Yannick Cahuzac for the season.

Transfers

In

Out

Squad and statistics 

|-
! colspan="15" style="background:#dcdcdc; text-align:center"| Goalkeepers

|-
! colspan="15" style="background:#dcdcdc; text-align:center"| Defenders

|-
! colspan="15" style="background:#dcdcdc; text-align:center"| Midfielders

|-
! colspan="15" style="background:#dcdcdc; text-align:center"| Forwards

|-
! colspan="15" style="background:#dcdcdc; text-align:center"| Players who appeared for Bastia no longer at the club

|}

Club

Coaching staff

Board

Kit
Supplier: KappaSponsor(s): Oscaro, Corsica Ferries, Invicta, Haute-Corse General Council, Collectivité Territoriale de Corse, and Technitoit

Source: kappa.fr

Pre-season 
Bastia, after a month of holiday blues have gone back to training and more specifically the Igesa this on July 2. For several weeks, they will submit a program that is both intense and varied, while chaining the preparatory meetings.

Leave ends for island players. For the fourth season, they find Frédéric Hantz and his staff for the preparation of pre-season, and therefore from that Tuesday afternoon on the side of Stade Armand Cesari for the delivery of equipment prior to the first session to Igesa. Once is not custom, no less than four players have already joined the club before himself resumed workouts. Drissa Diakité, François Modesto, Florian Raspentino and Claudiu Keserü indeed discover their teammates and especially Mickaël Landreau who has just re-enlist for a season with the club. If other arrivals will of course take place in the days and weeks ahead, Frédéric Hantz still have a group rather provided to start the preparation as it should be, despite the departures Florian Thauvin (Lille), Anthony Modeste (Bordeaux) and Jérôme Rothen this morning.

All these people will have six weeks to prepare for the resumption of the competition will be on the side of the Beaujoire on August 10. Meanwhile, two courses will be provided on the side of Vezzani and Combloux (Haute-Savoie), and several new friends, including the latest on August 3, against an opponent that will be announced very soon.

Matches

Competitions

Ligue 1

League table

Results summary

Results by round

Matches

Last updated: 17 May 2014Source: sc-bastia.net, LFP.fr

Coupe de la Ligue

Coupe de France

Statistics

Disciplinary record

The season firsts 

 Largest losing margin: 2 goals
 Nantes 2–0 Bastia (10 August 2013)

 Highest scoring game: 2 goals
 Nantes 2–0 Bastia (10 August 2013)
 First yellow card of the season: 11 minutes – Yannick Cahuzac against Nantes (10 August 2013)
 Last yellow card of the season: 45+1 minutes – Florian Raspentino against Nantes (10 August 2013)
 Fastest yellow card of the season: 11 minutes – Yannick Cahuzac against Nantes (10 August 2013)
 Latest yellow card of the season: 45+1 minutes – Florian Raspentino against Nantes (10 August 2012)
 First red card of the season: 70 minutes – Ilan against Nantes (10 August 2013)
 Last red card of the season: 70 minutes – Ilan against Nantes (10 August 2013)
 Fastest red card of the season: 70 minutes – Ilan against Nantes (10 August 2013)
 Latest red card of the season: 70 minutes – Ilan against Nantes (10 August 2013)

References 

SC Bastia seasons
Bastia